Brachynopterus rufulus is a species of beetle in the family Carabidae, the only species in the genus Brachynopterus.

References

Lebiinae